Prey Veng Football Club (Khmer: ក្លឹបបាល់ទាត់ខេត្តព្រៃវែង), is a football club based in Prey Veng Province, Cambodia. The club usually competes in the Hun Sen Cup, the major national cup competition of Cambodian football. After an unbeaten run in the 2020 Cambodian Second League, the club made debut in the 2021 Cambodian League, the top flight of Cambodian football.

Current squad

Coaching staff

Honours
Cambodian Second League
Winner (1): 2020
 Hun Sen Cup
  Third Place (1): 2020

References

Football clubs in Cambodia